The 2021–22 Boise State Broncos men's basketball team represented Boise State University in the Mountain West Conference during the 2021–22 NCAA Division I men's basketball season. Led by twelfth-year head coach Leon Rice, the Broncos played their home games on campus at ExtraMile Arena in Boise, Idaho. They finished the regular season at 24–7 (15–3 in Mountain West, first).

The top seed in the conference tournament, Boise State  defeated Nevada, Wyoming, and San Diego State to win the title and the automatic bid to the NCAA tournament. Seeded eighth in the West region, the Broncos traveled west to Portland, but lost in the first round to Memphis and finished at 27–8.

Previous season
In a season limited due to the ongoing COVID-19 pandemic, the Broncos finished the 2020–21 regular season at 18–7 (14–6 in Mountain West, fourth). They lost in the quarterfinals of the conference tournament to Nevada, and received an at-large bid of the National Invitation Tournament. The Broncos traveled to Texas and defeated SMU in the first round, but fell to eventual champion Memphis in the quarterfinals to finish the season at 19–9 overall.

Offseason

Departures

2021 recruiting class

Roster

Source

Schedule and results

|- 
!colspan=9 style=| Non-conference regular season

|- 
!colspan=9 style=| Mountain West regular season

|-
!colspan=9 style=| Mountain West tournament

|-
!colspan=9 style=| NCAA tournament

Source

Rankings

*AP does not release post-NCAA tournament rankings^Coaches did not release a Week 1 poll.

References

Boise State Broncos men's basketball seasons
Boise State
Boise
Boise State